Panjalu may refer to:
Kediri (historical kingdom), medieval Javanese kingdom also known as Panjalu
Panjalu, a district in the Ciamis Regency, Indonesia